Telugu Saamskruthika Niketanam, also called World Telugu Museum, is located in Visakhapatnam, Andhra Pradesh, India.

Objectives
The museum's main objective is to show Telugu history and culture from the Satavahana dynasty until modern times. It has 42 episodes on the arts, folk arts, great poets, language, literature and history of great personalities in Telugu society.

Gallery

See also
 List of museums in India

References

External links

Museums in Visakhapatnam
Cultural heritage
Heritage centre
2018 establishments in Andhra Pradesh
Museums established in 2018